Keenan is an unincorporated community in Monroe County, West Virginia, United States. Keenan is located on West Virginia Route 3, east of Union.

The community was named after Edward Keenan, a local landowner.

References

Unincorporated communities in Monroe County, West Virginia
Unincorporated communities in West Virginia